"Qué Linda Manita" is a Spanish lullaby.

It was featured in the fifth segment ("Loin du 16e") of the 2006 film Paris, je t'aime, in which a young woman (Catalina Sandino Moreno) sings the song to both her baby and later to her employer's baby. The song is popular with Hispanic children. While singing the song a hand motion is done, where the listener and the singer twist their hand back and forth, to encourage memory.

Different Hispanic countries have local variations of the song.

References

Lullabies
Spanish-language songs
Spanish children's songs
Traditional children's songs